Arunachalesvarar Temple is a Siva temple located at Ammapettai in Papanasam taluk, Thanjavur district of Tamil Nadu, India, at a distance of 21 km east from Thanjavur.

Presiding deity 
The presiding deity is Arunachalesvarar. The Goddess is known as Dharmasamvarthani. Though the main entrance is in the east, devotees prefer to come to the temple through the south entrance.

Structure 
The temple has prakara, vimana of the presiding deity and goddess. In the mahamandapa balipeetam and nandhi are found. In the left Nataraja sabha, shrines of goddess and Navagraha are found. In the right side of the shrine of the sanctum sanctorum shrine of Somaskanda and in the left shrine of Vikramakali are found. In the prakara shrines of Vinayaka, Muruga, Kasilingam, Gajalakshmi, Ramalingam, Chandikesvara, Durga, Sanisvara, Bhairava and Sivasurya are found. In the kosta, Vinayaka, Dakshinamurti, Lingodbhava, Brahma and Durga are found.

Puja 
Puja is held twice. The festivals of this temple include Pradosha, Sankadaharasaturtti, Teypirai Ashtami, Karthikai Somavaram, and Tiruvathirai.

Kumbhabhishekham
The Kumbhabhishekham of this temple was held on 15 September 2005.

References

External links
 நாரதர் உலா, சிதைவுபடும் சிவாலயம், சக்தி விகடன், 5 செப்டம்பர் 2019
 அம்மாப்பேட்டையில் ஞானசம்பந்தர் ஐக்கிய மூலத் திருநாள், தினமணி, 20 மே 2022
 திருஞானசம்பந்தர் ஐக்கிய ஜோதி உலா, தினத்தந்தி, 21 மே 2022
 Shaivam Org. Papanasam Taluk, Ammapettai Arunachaleshwarar Temple

Photogallery 

Shiva temples in Thanjavur district